Blencowe can refer to

Places
 Blencow, village near Penrith, Cumbria, England
 Blencow railway station, nearby disused railway station

People
As a surname
 Alan Blencowe (born 1976), British racing driver
 Arlene Blencowe (born 1983), Australian mixed martial artist and boxer
 Elizabeth Blencowe (born 1961), Australian sprint canoeist
 Mary Penelope Blencowe (1795–1861), wife of British Army officer James Grant

As a forename
 Edward Blencowe Gould (1847–1916), British consul in Bangkok